Dhulchand Damor (born 8 August 1964) is an Indian archer. He competed in the men's individual and team events at the 1992 Summer Olympics.

References

1964 births
Living people
Indian male archers
Olympic archers of India
Archers at the 1992 Summer Olympics
Place of birth missing (living people)